S. Thomas' Preparatory School (abbreviated as STPS) is a private, Anglican, multi-ethnic, primary and secondary day school for boys aged 5 to 16 years, located in Kollupitiya in the Colombo District of the Western Province of Sri Lanka.

The school was founded on 17 May 1938 as a branch preparatory school of S. Thomas' College, Mount Lavinia. It is governed by the Board of Governors of S. Thomas' College of the Church of Ceylon. The school is amongst the elite schools of Sri Lanka and is affiliated with the three other Thomian schools and colleges administered by the Church of Ceylon.

History
S. Thomas' Preparatory School was founded on 17 May 1938 by William Thomas Keble, the school's first headmaster, while Sri Lanka was under British colonial rule. Keble was a British scholar, author, educationalist, and an alumnus of Keble College, Oxford, which was named after his maternal great-uncle John Keble. He arrived in Ceylon in 1928 to join the staff of S. Thomas' College, Mount Lavinia, during the tenure of warden Kenneth McPherson.

He was the author of several books, including Ceylon, Beaten Track, A History of St. Thomas' College, Colombo, and Astrapani: A Romance of Sigiriya, a novel based on Sigiriya. The school was the first preparatory school to be established in Sri Lanka based on the English public school model.

The institution, which commenced with a student population of 95 boys and a staff of seven teachers, currently has a student population of 975 and over 100 staff members. At first, the school only accepted students between the ages of 5 and 11 years, as its founders sought to remedy a conceptual void in the educational system by placing a new emphasis on the requirements and aspirations of younger children to be educated and to be allowed to express their creative talents and faculties unfettered and unhampered by older and more mature students. Nevertheless, over the years the school began accepting older students, and currently has classes up to grade 11 in preparation for the GCE Ordinary Level examination.

School administration 
The school is governed by the Anglican Church of Ceylon. It is classified as a private fee levying school and is not financially dependent on the government. It is administered by a Board of Governors (established by the S. Thomas' College Board of Governors Ordinance No. 7 of 1930) of which the chairman is the Anglican Bishop of Colombo, thereby retaining a connection between the church and the school. The day-to-day activities are managed by the headmaster. The school has a sectional head for the upper, middle, and primary schools.

Rev. Dushantha Lakshman Rodrigo assumed duties as headmaster on 1 January 2015 and continued to serve until 2021, when he was appointed the 16th Anglican Bishop of Colombo.

Rev. Nihal Fernando was inducted as the school's sixth headmaster in February 2021.

Demographics 
The student population is in excess of 900 students, aged 5 to 16 years, although the roll has declined from its peak of around 1,100 students in the year 2000. The students come from diverse ethnic backgrounds (Sinhala, Tamil and Moor amongst others). The four main faiths practiced by the students of the school, in descending order of frequency, are Christianity, Buddhism, Hinduism, and Islam. The majority of students live in the suburbs of Colombo.

Facilities

The school campus consists of an assembly hall, over 50 classrooms, a chapel, a computer laboratory, two music rooms, three art rooms, two playing fields, two basketball courts and a cafeteria. The school has separate laboratory facilities for science.

House system 
Students of the school are allocated into are allocated into one of four houses: 

The houses compete against each other in many sporting events throughout the year. An athletics championship, traditionally held each year in February, facilitates students in each of the four houses to compete in athletic events.

Headmasters

Alumni 
S. Thomas' Preparatory School has produced many noteworthy and distinguished figures. Old students of the school are referred to as Past Prepites. Amongst them are Wasim Thajudeen (Sri Lankan Rugby union player), Shehan Karunatilaka (Author and Winner of the 2022 Booker Prize), Ruwan Wijewardene (Incumbent Senior advisor to the President on Climate change) and Sajith Premadasa (Current Leader of the Opposition of Sri Lanka).

See also
:Category:Alumni of S. Thomas' Preparatory School, Kollupitiya
List of schools in Sri Lanka

References

1938 establishments in Ceylon
Educational institutions established in 1938
Geoffrey Bawa buildings
Private schools in Sri Lanka
Schools in Colombo
Boys' schools in Sri Lanka